Young Wallander is a crime drama streaming television series, based on Henning Mankell's fictional Inspector Kurt Wallander. The series premiered on Netflix on 3 September 2020. Star Adam Pålsson explained that the pre-imagining (i.e., Young Wallander being set in the present day) made more sense than a straight prequel, as it allowed for the social commentary which is a strong element of Mankell's original Wallander. This choice of setting the series in the modern day has been criticised in a number of reviews.

In November 2020, the series was renewed for a second season, which was premiered on Netflix on 17 February 2022, subtitled as Killer's Shadow.

Premise

Cast and characters
Adam Pålsson as Kurt Wallander
Richard Dillane as Superintendent Josef Hemberg
Leanne Best as Frida Rask
Ellise Chappell as Mona
Yasen Atour as Reza Al-Rahman 
Charles Mnene as Bashir "Bash"
Jacob Collins-Levy as Karl-Axel Munck
Alan Emrys as Gustav Munck 
Jack Bandeira as Markus
Kiza Deen as Mariam
Joanna Preston as Female Anchor (Season 2)

Episodes

Series overview

Season 1 (2020)

Season 2 (2022)

Production
On 11 September 2019, it was announced that filming had begun. Although set in Malmö, Sweden, it was shot in and around Vilnius, Lithuania.

Critical response 
On the review aggregator website Rotten Tomatoes, 64% of 14 critics' reviews for the first season are positive, with an average rating of 4.90/10. The website's consensus reads, "Bearing little resemblance to the beloved procedural it presumes to reboot, Young Wallander is dispiritingly unenlightening as a prequel and merely functional as a drama in its own right."

Reviewed by Ellen E. Jones in The Guardian who gave the series 3 out of 5 stars. "Netflix's prequel to the Wallander novels and TV series takes place in the present day, weaving in contemporary politics – but would a straight origin story have been better?" Jones felt a more traditional prequel set in the 1970s may have been more interesting: "Just imagine if the show had researched and recreated 70s Malmö, where the Henriksson-timeline Wallander would have been a rookie? Imagine exploring how that very specific time and place – the era of plane hijacking, radical politics and Abba's Eurovision win – shaped Wallander's character? Now that would have been a case worth digging into."

Reviewed in The Telegraph by Chris Bennion, the series was given 1 star out of 5. "Here we have it, ladies and gentlemen – surely the worst TV drama of the streaming era. Or, to put it another way, if you loved Wallander, you’ll hate Young Wallander."

Reviewed by Beth Webb for NME, given 3 out of 5 stars. Webb states "Despite its strong aesthetic, the show's target audience seems unclear. Wallander has built a sizeable following over its extended lifespan, and older fans may struggle to connect with this modern version. But the story doesn't feel suitable for a younger audience either. As a short, suspense-laden crime drama, this is a justifiable watch, especially with its low-episode count. For those seeking another dose of their favourite seasoned Swedish inspector, however, you're better off revisiting the original."

References

External links

2020 Swedish television series debuts
Swedish crime television series
Swedish drama television series
Detective television series
English-language Netflix original programming
Scania in fiction
Television series by Banijay
Television shows based on Swedish novels
Television shows set in Sweden
Wallander